Nicholas Montgomery McCrory (born August 9, 1991) is an American psychiatrist, former diver and was a member of the national team from 2007 to 2014.

He won his first international medal, a silver, at the World Junior Championship in 2006. At the 2011 World Aquatics Championships in Shanghai, China, he competed with partner David Boudia in the synchronized 10-meter platform and finished fifth. In the 10-meter competition, he finished in sixth place.

McCrory graduated from East Chapel Hill High School and from Duke University, where he won several medals at college competitions. He won the gold medal in 10-meter platform at the 2011 US National Championships at UCLA on August 14. McCrory was named to CSCAA's list of the 100 Greatest Swimmers and Divers in History.

He retired from diving in November 2014 to pursue medical studies.

2012 Summer Olympics
McCrory and his partner David Boudia won the bronze in the synchronized 10m platform with a total score of 463.47.  This was the first Olympic medal for the United States in men's diving since the 1996 games in Atlanta. He placed ninth in the men's individual 10-meter platform diving event as well.

Personal life
McCrory was born on August 9, 1991 in Durham, North Carolina to Douglas and Ana McCrory. His uncle, Gordon Downie competed in the 1976 Summer Olympics.  He has a younger brother, Lucas, who swims and participates in Paralympics events. He received his B.A. and M.D. degrees from Duke University, and a Master’s in Physiology from North Carolina State University.

References 

1991 births
Living people
Duke Blue Devils men's divers
Olympic bronze medalists for the United States in diving
Divers at the 2012 Summer Olympics
Medalists at the 2012 Summer Olympics
American male divers
People from Chapel Hill, North Carolina
Sportspeople from Durham, North Carolina